Mistletoe Corners is an unincorporated community in Columbia County, in the U.S. state of Georgia. The community lends its name to nearby Mistletoe State Park.

History
A variant name is "Mistletoe". A post office called Mistletoe was established in 1894, and remained in operation until 1916.

References

Unincorporated communities in Columbia County, Georgia
Unincorporated communities in Georgia (U.S. state)